The 1902–03 Nebraska Cornhuskers men's basketball team represented the University of Nebraska during the 1902–03 collegiate men's basketball season. The head coach was Walter G Hiltner, coaching the huskers in his first season. The team played their home games at Grant Memorial Hall in Lincoln, Nebraska.

Schedule

|-

References

Nebraska Cornhuskers men's basketball seasons
Nebraska